Wilmar Alexander Roldán Pérez (born 24 January 1980 in Remedios, Antioquia) is a Colombian football referee. He was ranked the World's 7th Best Referee of 2015 by the IFFHS.

He has been a referee in the domestic league since 2003 and became a FIFA International in 2008.

He was selected for his maiden Copa América tournament in 2011, where he officiated in two group matches and the third-place match between Venezuela and Peru. Roldán has also officiated at the 2012 Olympic tournament and 2014 FIFA World Cup qualifiers.

In March 2013, FIFA named Roldán to its list of 52 candidate referees for the 2014 FIFA World Cup in Brazil. In January 2014, FIFA included Wilmar Roldán in its refereeing team for the World Cup. He was the head referee in the Group A match between Mexico and Cameroon.

In April 2017, Roldán was selected as a referee for the 2017 FIFA Confederations Cup in Russia. He was selected to officiate the tournament's opening game between the host nation Russia and New Zealand.

In June 2018, Roldán was selected to referee England vs Tunisia in the 2018 FIFA World Cup in Russia.

References

External links 
WorldReferee.com - Wilmar Roldán
Profile on RateTheRef.net

1980 births
Living people
Sportspeople from Antioquia Department
Colombian football referees
Copa América referees
Olympic football referees
Football referees at the 2012 Summer Olympics
2014 FIFA World Cup referees
2018 FIFA World Cup referees